Margarete (Marga) von Etzdorf (1 August 1907 - 28 May 1933) was a German aircraft pilot, notable for being the first woman hired to fly for an airline, and the first woman to fly solo across Siberia, from Germany to Tokyo, Japan.

Career

When she was 19 year old, von Etzdorf received a pilot's license, the second woman after Thea Rasche to do so after the First World War. On 19 February 1928, she became the first woman to fly for an airline. Since the Deutsche Verkehrsfliegerschule did not accept women at the time, she was mostly self-taught, although she received support from Melitta Schiller, who worked as an engineer at the Deutsche Versuchsanstalt für Luftfahrt. She began flying a commercial Junkers F.13, nicknamed , Berliner for "look in the world," for Lufthansa, then DLH. She flew on the Berlin-Breslau and Berlin-Stuttgart-Basel routes.

In 1930, with support from her grandparents, von Etzdorf brought herself a Junkers A 50ce, "Junior," which she painted bright yellow. She flew her first long-distance flight with it, to Istanbul. Soon afterward, she attempted to fly to the Canary Islands, but her plane suffered severe damage due to a severe storm above Italy. It had to be sent by train to the Junkers factory, to be repaired. 18 August 1931 she began her record-breaking flight to Tokyo. After 12 days, on 29 August 1932, she landed at Haneda Airport, where she was received warmly. The construction of the airport, costing approximately half-a-million dollars at the time, had recently finished, and von Etzdorf was the first foreigner to enter Japan by that port. Her flight back was not as successful, due to a severe loss in altitude that left the aircraft damaged beyond repair and the pilot severely injured after taking off from a stopover in Bangkok. She made the most of her time in what is now Thailand, being the first person to send reports of the Siamese Revolution to Europe. She returned to Berlin on 18 July 1932.

Personal life
The daughter of a captain in the Prussian Army, Fritz Wolff, and his wife Margarete, she lost both of her parents in an accident in Ragusa, Sicily when she was four years old. After the accident, she and her sister, Ursula, lived with their grandparents , a General in the Prussian army and his wife.

After returning from Tokyo, Elly Beinhorn suggested she fly to Cape Town, South Africa. On 27 May 1933, she attempted to make a stopover near Aleppo, but lost control of her Klemm Kl 32, due to heavy winds. After dealing with the necessary formalities, she asked for a private room, where, not even an hour after the crash, she killed herself, because she felt that she could not bear returning to Germany. She was buried in the Invalidenfriedhof in Berlin, but her grave was destroyed in the 1970s, due to its proximity to the Berlin Wall. Her gravestone read , or "flying is worth life".

References

German women aviators
Commercial aviators
Women commercial aviators
Aviation pioneers
Flight distance record holders
German aviation record holders
Haneda Airport
1907 births
1933 deaths
German women aviation record holders
1933 suicides
Suicides in Syria